A special election was held on April 28, 2020, after a February 4, 2020 primary, to fill the remainder of the term in the United States House of Representatives for  in the 116th U.S. Congress. Elijah Cummings, the incumbent representative, died in office on October 17, 2019.

On October 28, 2019, Governor Larry Hogan announced the dates for the special primary on February 4, 2020, and the special general election on April 28, 2020, to coincide with the primary voting for the November 2020 general election.

Due to COVID-19 concerns, Hogan announced on March 17, 2020 that the 7th district special general election would be conducted by mail-in ballot only on April 28, while the regular primary election would be postponed to June 2.

On April 13, 2020, the Maryland State Board of Elections decided that three in-person voting centers would be open for the April 28 special general election, one in each local jurisdiction; Baltimore City, Baltimore County and Howard County.

Democratic primary

Candidates

Nominee
 Kweisi Mfume, former president and CEO of NAACP and former U.S. Representative for Maryland's 7th congressional district (1987–1996)

Defeated in primary
 T. Dan Baker, Public Health and Community Development Professional
 Talmadge Branch, state delegate
 Alicia D. Brown
 Anthony Carter Sr., Democratic candidate for Maryland's 7th congressional district in 2018
 Jill P. Carter, state senator
 Matko Lee Chullin III
 Jay Fred Cohen, Howard County Judge of Orphans Court (2006-2010), 2014 candidate for Maryland House of Delegates, District 12
 Nathaniel M. Costley Sr., 2018 Democratic candidate for the Maryland House of Delegates, District 10
 Maya Rockeymoore Cummings, former chairwoman of the Maryland Democratic Party and widow of U.S. Representative Elijah Cummings
 Jermyn Davidson
 Darryl Gonzalez, author
 Mark Gosnell, pulmonologist
 Leslie Grant, former president of the National Dental Association
 Dan L. Hiegel, Democratic candidate for Maryland's 3rd congressional district in 1994 and 1996
 F. Michael Higginbotham, professor, University of Baltimore School of Law
 Terri Hill, state delegate
 Jay Jalisi, state delegate
 Paul V. Konka, teacher, 2018 candidate for Baltimore County school board
 Adrian Petrus, 2018 Democratic candidate for the Maryland State Senate, District 47, Democratic candidate for Maryland's 7th congressional district in 2016
 Saafir Rabb, community activist
 Charles U. Smith, Democratic candidate for Maryland's 7th congressional district in 2018
 Harry Spikes, former Cummings staffer, 2014 Democratic candidate for the Maryland House of Delegates, District 45
 Charles Stokes, Democratic candidate for Maryland's 7th congressional district in 2018

Withdrew
 Brian Britcher, firefighter — withdrew candidacy on 11/7/19

Declined 
Vanessa Atterbeary, state delegate
Calvin Ball III, Howard County executive
Antonio Hayes, state senator
Keith E. Haynes, state delegate
Ben Jealous, former president and CEO of the NAACP and nominee for Governor of Maryland in 2018 (endorsed Jill Carter)
Cory V. McCray, state senator
Stephanie Rawlings-Blake, former mayor of Baltimore and former Secretary of the Democratic National Committee
Charles E. Sydnor III, state delegate

Endorsements

Results

Republican primary

Candidates

Nominee
 Kimberly Klacik, community activist, Baltimore County Republican Committeewoman, and non-profit founder

Defeated in primary
 Christopher M. Anderson, activist
 James C. Arnold
 Ray Bly, Republican candidate for Maryland's 7th congressional district in 2016 and 2018, Republican candidate for Maryland's 2nd congressional district in 2012
 Brian L. Brown
 Reba A. Hawkins, community activist
 Liz Matory, nominee for Maryland's 2nd congressional district in 2018
 William T. Newton, election integrity and community activist, Republican candidate for Maryland's 7th congressional district in 2016 and 2018, and Baltimore County Republican Committeeman

Results

General election

Predictions

Results

See also
 List of special elections to the United States House of Representatives

References

External links
Official campaign websites
 Kim Klacik (R) for Congress 
 Kweisi Mfume (D) for Congress

Maryland 2020 07
2020 07
Maryland 2020 07
Maryland 07
United States House of Representatives 07
United States House of Representatives 2020 07